Renita or Renitta is a feminine given name.

List of people with the given name 

 Renita Brunton, suspected murder victim of Peter Dupas
 Renita Farrell (born 1972), Australian former field hockey player
Renitta Shannon (born 1979), American politician
 Renita J. Weems (born 1954), American Hebrew Bible scholar

See also 

 Reniță

Given names
Feminine given names